The 1977 Pontins Professional was the fourth edition of the professional invitational snooker tournament which took place in May 1977 in Prestatyn, Wales.

The tournament featured twelve professional players. Eight players were eliminated in the group stage, with the other four advancing to the group play-offs.

John Spencer won the event, beating John Pulman 7–5 in the final.


Group stage

  Eddie Charlton 3–1 Doug Mountjoy 
  Eddie Charlton 3–1 Fred Davis 
  Fred Davis 3–0 Cliff Thorburn 
  Fred Davis 3–2 Rex Williams 
  Perrie Mans 3–1 Dennis Taylor 
  Perrie Mans 3–1 Willie Thorne 
  Graham Miles 3–0 Willie Thorne 
  Graham Miles 3–0 Ray Reardon 
  Graham Miles 3–1 Perrie Mans 
  Doug Mountjoy 3–1 Fred Davis 
  Doug Mountjoy 3–1 Rex Williams 
  John Pulman 3–0 Eddie Charlton 
  John Pulman 3–1 Doug Mountjoy 
  John Pulman 3–1 Rex Williams 
  John Pulman 3–2 Fred Davis 
  Ray Reardon 3–0 Dennis Taylor 
  Ray Reardon 3–1 Graham Miles 
  Ray Reardon 3–1 Perrie Mans 
  John Spencer 3–0 Ray Reardon 
  John Spencer 3–1 Graham Miles 
  John Spencer 3–1 Perrie Mans 
  Dennis Taylor 3–0 Willie Thorne 
  Dennis Taylor 3–1 Graham Miles 
  Dennis Taylor 3–1 John Spencer 
  Cliff Thorburn 3–0 John Pulman 
  Cliff Thorburn 3–1 Doug Mountjoy 
  Cliff Thorburn 3–1 Eddie Charlton 
  Cliff Thorburn 3–2 Rex Williams 
  Willie Thorne 3–1 John Spencer 
  Rex Williams 3–1 Eddie Charlton

Knockout stage

References

Pontins Professional
Snooker competitions in Wales
Pontins Professional
Pontins Professional
Pontins Professional
Pontins Professional